In numerical analysis, the Clenshaw algorithm, also called Clenshaw summation, is a recursive method to evaluate a linear combination of Chebyshev polynomials.  The method was published by Charles William Clenshaw in 1955. It is a generalization of Horner's method for evaluating a linear combination of monomials.

It generalizes to more than just Chebyshev polynomials; it applies to any class of functions that can be defined by a three-term recurrence relation.

Clenshaw algorithm

In full generality, the Clenshaw algorithm computes the weighted sum of a finite series of functions :

where  is a sequence of functions that satisfy the linear recurrence relation

To perform the summation for given series of coefficients , compute the values  by the "reverse" recurrence formula:

Note that this computation makes no direct reference to the functions .
the desired sum can be expressed in terms of them and the simplest functions  and :

See Fox and Parker for more information and stability analyses.

Examples

Horner as a special case of Clenshaw
A particularly simple case occurs when evaluating a polynomial of the form
.
The functions are simply

In this case, the recurrence formula to compute the sum is

and, in this case, the sum is simply
,
which is exactly the usual Horner's method.

Special case for Chebyshev series
Consider a truncated Chebyshev series

The coefficients in the recursion relation for the Chebyshev polynomials are

with the initial conditions

Thus, the recurrence is

and the final sum is

One way to evaluate this is to continue the recurrence one more step, and compute

(note the doubled a0 coefficient) followed by

Meridian arc length on the ellipsoid
Clenshaw summation is extensively used in geodetic applications.  A simple application is summing the trigonometric series to compute
the meridian arc distance on the surface of an ellipsoid.  These have the form

Leaving off the initial  term, the remainder is a summation of the appropriate form. There is no leading term because .

,

making the coefficients in the recursion relation

and the evaluation of the series is given by

The final step is made particularly simple because , so the end of the recurrence is simply ; the  term is added separately:

Difference in meridian arc lengths
Sometimes it necessary to compute the difference of two meridian arcs in
a way that maintains high relative accuracy.  This is accomplished by
using trigonometric identities to write

Clenshaw summation can be applied in this case
provided we simultaneously compute 
and perform a matrix summation,

where

 satisfies the recurrence
relation

where

The standard Clenshaw algorithm can now be applied to yield

where  are 2×2 matrices.  Finally
we have

This technique can be used in the limit 
we take .

See also
Horner scheme to evaluate polynomials in monomial form
De Casteljau's algorithm to evaluate polynomials in Bézier form

References

Numerical analysis